Bojan Pajtić (born 2 May 1970) is a Serbian politician who served as the President of the Government of Vojvodina from 2004 to 2016.

He was the leader of the Democratic Party from 2014 to 2016. Pajtić holds an advanced degree from the University of Novi Sad Faculty of Law. Besides his native Serbian, he also speaks Hungarian, and English.

References

External links 

Bojan Pajtić (in Serbian)
Glas Javnosti

|-

|-

|-

1970 births
Living people
People from Senta
Democratic Party (Serbia) politicians
Members of the Executive Council of Vojvodina
Government ministers of Vojvodina
Members of the National Assembly (Serbia)
University of Novi Sad alumni